Melur is the Northern entrance of Madurai district. It is the town and municipality in the Madurai North in the Indian state of Tamil Nadu. Melur Old Name is Called Naduvi Nadu. The name Melur name comes from "Mela Nadu". Melur is called Thaigramam ('Mother of Villages'). It is the biggest taluk within the Madurai District. As of 2011, the town had a population of 40,017. Melur is an agricultural land in Madurai and the climate around the area is tropical.

Melur is a manufacturer and exporter of ploughs. It has many cast iron industrial. Granite production is an important industry; granite from Melur is exported around the world. Situated within a largely agricultural area, most of the people living around Melur are employed in agriculture, chiefly in the cultivation of rice. A few people have been working as masons and assistants in home construction. Gandiva Foundation is a public charitable trust functioning at Melur.

Geography

Demographics

According to the 2011 census, Melur had a population of 40,017 with a sex-ratio of 961 females for every 1,000 males,  much above the national average of 929. A total of 4,488 were under the age of six, constituting 2,353 males and 2,135 females. Scheduled Castes and Scheduled Tribes accounted for 12.33% and 0.39% of the population respectively. The average literacy of the town was 79.47%, compared to the national average of 72.99%. The town had a total of 9872 households. There were a total of 14,126 workers, comprising 355 cultivators, 1,493 main agricultural labourers, 295 in household industries, 10,470 other workers, 1,513 marginal workers, 33 marginal cultivators, 230 marginal agricultural labourers, 88 marginal workers in household industries and 1,162 other marginal workers.

As per the religious census of 2011, Melur had 78% Hindus, 17% Muslims, 5% Christians, 0.0% Sikhs and 0.0% following other religions.

Religion, Beliefs & Festival
The local religion involves as follows:

There is a temple for the Lord Shiva temple, Aanjaneyar and the goddess Draupathi, who was wife of the Pandavas. Two important events are the Biman–Keesakan fight and Pookkuli Festival. In the first event, one person will be acting as Bima and another as Keesakan. Keesakan tries to run away from Bima, and the latter will chase and kill him. The Pookkuli (walking on ignited coals) festival is celebrated every year by the Draupathi Amman Temple. On the Pookkuli day, devotees who have offered prayers to the goddess will perform fire walking. Pathinettankudi manjuu verattu is celebrated on every mattupongal day, and there is a big masjid at trichy main road which is head of other masjids in Melur.

The Naagammal Temple Festival is celebrated every year. Poochorithal is the main event of the festival. Santhana Koodu Festival is celebrated in the al ameen masjid every year. The Ealai Katha Amman Temple festival, Kottakudi Eruthu Kattu, and the Ayyanar Temple Puravi Eduppu Festival are also celebrated around Melur. The Kathapillai street Kaliamman festival is celebrated every year in June.

Vetrilai piri thiruvizha (Beetal leaf festival) is a festival celebrated in Vellalur Nadu near Melur in Madhurai on the first day of Chithirai month to celebrate communal harmony. Hindus and Muslims celebrate this together.

There is Mary L Flagg CSI church located near Sandhaipettai and regular prayers have been organised and conducted in this church which belongs to the Church of South India. This church was built during the British rule in 1904. It's 114 years old, as of 2018.

Transport
Madurai Airport is the nearest airport from Melur, which operates domestic flight services and international flights service. such as Air India, SpiceJet, SriLankan Airlines and IndiGo.

Melur has a bus stand, which is used by TNSTC and private operators. This is situated inside the town on Madurai- Trichy NH45B. Melur has bus transportation to Madurai, Chennai, Trichy, Manamadurai, Dindigul, Coimbatore, Karaikudi, Pudukottai, Ramanathapuram, Thirunelveli, Virudhunagar, Tanjore, Rajapalayam, Chidambaram, Nagapattinam, Mayiladuthurai, Pattukkottai and all around the neighbouring districts. Madurai Junction is the nearest railway station.

Tourist spots 

 Alagar Kovil

Alagar Kovil is a village in Melur Constituency. The history & living of the village is centered around Kallazhagar Temple. It is one of the 108 Divyadesam dedicated to Lord Vishnu, worshipped as Kallazhagar and his consort Lakshmi as Thirumagal.

 Pazhamudircholai Murugan Temple:

It is one of the six important abodes (Arupadaiveedu) of Lord Muruga. It is located close to the Vishnu Temple of Azhagar Kovil. Among the Arupadaiveedu, Pazhamudircholai temple is the last one. Lord Muruga at Pazhamudircholai is praised in old Tamil literature works such as Silappathikaram,  Ettuthokai and Pattupattu.

 Thiruvathavur Thirumarainathar shivan Temple:

It is one of the very famous and ancient Shiva Temple, which is located in the Thiruvathavur village of Melur constituency. It was constructed by a 9th-century Tamil Poet Maanikkavaasagar. He has done many popular religious literature works. His Thiruvasagam Book is considered one of the precious books of Shaiva hymns.

New Rail line Proposal 
Madurai-Melur-Tirupattur-Karaikudi New BG Line: As sanctioned by Railway Board in the year 2007–08, Survey was taken and the report has been submitted to Railway Board on 29/07/2008. Then updating survey was sanctioned in the year 2013-14 and the survey report was submitted to Railway board on 27/11/2014. Railway Board has shelved the proposal at present. Decision of Railway Board is awaited.

Politics
Melur (state assembly constituency) is part of Madurai (Lok Sabha constituency). S. Venkatesan also known as  Su. Venkatesan from CPI(M) is the Member of Parliament, Lok Sabha, after his election in the 2019 Indian general election.

The major political parties in Melur are ADMK, DMK Dravida Munnetra Kazhagam, Indian National Congress, and Desiya Murpokku Dravida Kazhagam.  Kakkan (late),  who served as State Minister during Kamarajar period was born in Melur. A statue is laid in Chekkadi.

Periya pullan contested the elections and elected as MLA of Melur town in 2021.

Periya pullan works for AIADMK party. MLA office which is constructed a decade ago in Sivagangai road remains unused as on date. 

AMMK Party was started by TTV Dinakaran at Melur on 15 March 2018. In July 2021, 90% of AMMK Cadres from Melur shifted base to DMK.

Famous people 
P. Kakkan was an Indian politician and freedom fighter who served as a member of the Constituent Assembly of India, Member of Parliament, President of the Tamil Nadu Congress Committee and in various ministerial posts in Congress governments in the erstwhile Madras state between 1957 and 1967. Kakkan was born into a Tamil family on 18 June 1908 in a village called Thumbaipatti in Melur Taluk, Madurai district of Madras Presidency. His father Poosari Kakkan was a priest in the village shrine.

References

Cities and towns in Madurai district